Lord Reginald's Derby Ride is a 1924 German silent comedy film directed by Arthur Teuber and starring Ralph Arthur Roberts and Fritz Kampers.

Cast
 Ernst Hofmann
 Uschi Elleot
 Jutta Jol
 Ralph Arthur Roberts
 Karl Platen
 Rudolf Klein-Rohden
 Wilhelm Kaiser-Heyl
 Fritz Kampers

References

Bibliography
 Alfred Krautz. International directory of cinematographers, set- and costume designers in film, Volume 4. Saur, 1984.

External links

1924 films
Films of the Weimar Republic
German silent feature films
Films directed by Arthur Teuber
1924 comedy films
German comedy films
German black-and-white films
Silent comedy films
1920s German films